The 1998 Davis Cup (also known as the 1998 Davis Cup by NEC for sponsorship purposes) was the 87th edition of the Davis Cup, the most important tournament between national teams in men's tennis. 131 teams entered the competition, 16 in the World Group, 30 in the Americas Zone, 30 in the Asia/Oceania Zone, and 55 in the Europe/Africa Zone. Honduras, Iraq, the Netherlands Antilles, Saint Lucia and the U.S. Virgin Islands made their first appearances in the tournament.

Sweden defeated Italy in the final, held at the Forum di Assago in Milan, Italy, on 4–6 December, to win their second consecutive title and their 7th title overall.

World Group

Draw

Final
Italy vs. Sweden

World Group Qualifying Round

Date: 25–28 September

The eight losing teams in the World Group first round ties and eight winners of the Zonal Group I final round ties competed in the World Group Qualifying Round for spots in the 1999 World Group.

Americas Zone

Group I

Group II

Group III
 Venue: Santa Cruz Tennis Club, Santa Cruz de la Sierra, Bolivia
 Date: 29 April–3 May

Final standings

  and  promoted to Group II in 1999.
  and  relegated to Group IV in 1999.

Group IV
 Venue: St. Lucia Racquet Club, Gros Islet, Saint Lucia
 Date: 23–29 March

Final standings

  and  promoted to Group III in 1999.

Asia/Oceania Zone

Group I

Group II

Group III
 Venue: National Centre, Kuala Lumpur, Malaysia
 Date: 15–19 April

Final standings

  and  promoted to Group II in 1999.
  and  relegated to Group IV in 1999.

Group IV
 Venue: National Complex, Ramna Park, Dhaka, Bangladesh
 Date: 9–15 February

Final standings

  and  promoted to Group III in 1999.

Europe/Africa Zone

Group I

Group II

Group III

Zone A
 Venue: Amicale Tennis Association, Lomé, Togo
 Date: 21–25 January

Final standings

  and  promoted to Group II in 1999.
  and  relegated to Group IV in 1999.

Zone B
 Venue: Jug Tennis Club, Skopje, Macedonia
 Date: 20–24 May

Final standings

  and  promoted to Group II in 1999.
  and  relegated to Group IV in 1999.

Group IV

Zone A
 Venue: Lugogo Tennis Club, Kampala, Uganda
 Date: 28 January–1 February

Final standings

  and  promoted to Group III in 1999.

Zone B
 Venue: Ndola Tennis Club, Ndola, Zambia
 Date: 6–10 May

Final standings

  and  promoted to Group III in 1999.

References
General

Specific

External links
Davis Cup official website

 
Davis Cups by year
Davis Cup
Davis Cup